Mary Ann Bell (fl. 1806 – fl. 1831), was a British fashion merchant, fashion designer and fashion journalist.  She was a leading figure in the British fashion industry of her day, particularly during the Napoleonic era, when Great Britain was in many ways isolated from the French fashion.

She had an agent in Paris, who informed her about the latest fashion, which she regularly displayed in her shop in London twice a week.  She was a designer, and the inventor of the Chapeau Bras (1820), a cap which could be folded, it was an essential part of military uniform in the 1700s .She as well as the Bandage Corset (1819), a corset specially designed for support during pregnancy, which was purchased by Princess Victoria of Saxe-Coburg-Saalfeld, giving her the right to refer to herself as 'Corset Maker to her Royal Highness, the Duchess of Kent'.   She participated as a fashion editor of the La Belle Assemblée as well as the 'World of Fashion and Continental Feuilletons', in which she displayed her own designed models.  In 1830, she officially supported the boycott of French fashion, though in practice made use of them in her own shop.

See also
 Ann Margaret Lanchester

References

Year of birth missing
Year of death missing
19th-century English businesspeople
British fashion designers
British fashion journalists
19th-century English businesswomen
British women fashion designers